The 9 Volt Years (Battery Powered Home Demos & Curios (1979-198?)) is a compilation of early recordings by Marshall Crenshaw. It includes first versions of Crenshaw's best known songs, including "Someday, Someway" and "You're My Favorite Waste Of Time".

Track listing
All songs written by Marshall Crenshaw, except where noted.
"Run Back to You" – 2:32
"Someday, Someway" – 2:33
"Love Can Be Bad Luck" (Crenshaw, David Was, Don Was) – 3:18
"Stay Fabulous" (Crenshaw, Robert Miller) – 2:29
"Everyone's in Love with You" (Robert Crenshaw, Marshall Crenshaw) – 2:25
"You're My Favorite Waste of Time" – 2:57
"Like a Vague Memory" – 3:21
"Bruce Is King" – 3:55
"That's It, I Quit, I'm Movin' On" (Roy Alfred, Del Serino) – 2:50
"She's Not You" (Robert Crenshaw, Don Jones) – 2:49
"The Thrill of the Fight" – 0:09
"First Love" (Crenshaw, Rick Cioffi, Fred Todd) – 2:22
"Something's Gonna Happen" – 2:00
"I'm Sorry" (Bo Diddley) – 2:25
"Rockin' Around in N.Y.C." – 2:53

References 

1998 albums
Marshall Crenshaw albums